Jumanji is a 1981 fantasy children's picture book written and illustrated by American author Chris Van Allsburg. The book is about an enchanted board game that implements wild animals and other jungle elements as the game is played in real life. The book was adapted into a 1995 film of the same name and it spawned a franchise that includes three sequels and an animated series.

According to Van Allsburg, the name Jumanji is a Zulu word meaning "many effects," referring to “the exciting consequences of the game,” which includes the unleashing of wild monkeys, untamed tigers and huge spiders into the world.

A sequel to the book, titled Zathura, was released in 2002.

Storyline
While their parents are out for the day, Judy and Peter Shepherd, after playing with some toys, become bored and decide to go to the park. There, they find a safari-themed board game called "Jumanji". Taking the game home, they find a warning message stating, "Do not begin unless you intend to finish". Ignoring the warning, they start to play.

The pair soon discovers that any dangers encountered in the game spring to life somewhere in the house. For example, when Peter rolls on a lion, an actual lion appears, which Judy and Peter trap in their mother's bedroom. Judy rolls on a stampede of rhinos, Peter rolls on a monsoon, and Judy rolls on an explorer—and each appears in real life to wreak havoc in the house. Still they continue to play, hoping that if they finish the game everything will go back to normal. The game finally ends when Judy wins and yells the name of the game.

In an instant, everything is back to normal and the siblings quickly return to the park and put the game back where they found it before their parents return. The story ends when Judy and Peter look outside and see their neighbors, Danny and Walter Budwing, excitedly returning from the park with Jumanji in their hands with the knowledge that their mother claims the brothers never bother to finish the games they play nor read the instructions.

Adaptations
Jumanji, a 1995 film based on the story, is an adaptation of the picture book. Unlike the short story, the film has adult characters that did not appear in the original short story like Alan Parrish (Robin Williams/Adam Hann-Byrd), Sarah Whittle (Bonnie Hunt/Laura Bell Bundy), Officer Carl Bentley (David Alan Grier), Aunt Nora (Bebe Neuwirth) and a big-game hunter named Van Pelt (Jonathan Hyde who also portrayed Alan's father, Sam Parrish). Not only is Alan Parrish the main protagonist instead of Judy (Kirsten Dunst) and Peter (Bradley Pierce), but a background story is added, in which the game trapped Alan in the jungle many years earlier while he and Sarah were playing back in 1969. Unlike the original story, the animals wreak havoc on the town and Peter turns into a monkey for cheating the game. In the film the snake is absent and crocodiles appear in the scene where Sarah summons the monsoon. 

Jumanji (TV series) is an animated TV series roughly based on the book and the film, which ran from 1996 to 1999. Unlike the book and film, the game transports Judy and Peter in the jungle after taking turns and reading a clue instead of releasing all of the jungle elements and there are other villains besides Van Pelt such as a merchant seller named Trader Slick and a scientist named Professor Ibsen. Also, Peter transforms into various animals while trying to cheat in a few episodes such as a monkey just like in the film and Alan Parrish from the film remains trapped in the game until the final episode and Danny and Walter from the end of the original book are absent. Also unlike the film Sarah Whittle does not appear in the series. Van Pelt does not leave the jungle like he did in the film, but still hunts Alan. Also in the show Alan was sucked into Jumanji in 1972 rather than 1969 as it happened in the film. The show also includes a tribe of tribal masks called the Manjis led by Tribal Bob. 

In 2011, Jumanji movie star Robin Williams recorded an audiobook for the book's 30th edition.

Jumanji: Welcome to the Jungle, is a 2017 film that stars Dwayne Johnson, Jack Black, Kevin Hart and Karen Gillan. Though explicitly a sequel, it is more of an action adventure than the 1995 film.

Jumanji: The Next Level is a 2019 sequel to the 2017 film, which returns stars Johnson, Black, Hart, and Gillan. Actors Awkwafina, Rory McCann, Danny Glover, and Danny DeVito also join the cast.

Sequel
Zathura (published in 2002) is a sequel to Jumanji also written by Van Allsburg. In the book, Danny and Walter Budwing (who appear at the end of Jumanji) find a science fiction board game whose elements similarly come to life. It was adapted to the film Zathura: A Space Adventure in 2005.

References

External links 
 
 

1981 American novels
1981 children's books
1981 fantasy novels
Caldecott Medal–winning works
American fantasy novels
American picture books
Novels by Chris Van Allsburg
Picture books by Chris Van Allsburg
Children's books adapted into films
Houghton Mifflin books
Fictional games
Jumanji